Mamaivtsi (укр. Мамаївці) is a village in Chernivtsi Raion in the southern part of Chernivtsi Oblast in western Ukraine. It hosts the administration of Mamaivtsi rural hromada, one of the hromadas of Ukraine. The population in 2001 was 5,818. The postal code is 59343. The telephone code is 3736.

History 
The village was first mentioned in 1580. Originally, Mamaivtsi had been part of the Bukovina historical region in the Principality of Moldavia. In January 1775, following the military conflict between Turkey and Russia (1768-1774), the Habsburg monarchy (currently Austria) received part of the territory of Moldova, known as Bukovina. Since 1775, Mamaivtsi, as part of the Duchy of Bukovina, was ruled by the Austrians, part of the Chernivtsi district (German Czernowitz).

Until 18 July 2020, Mamaivtsi belonged to Kitsman Raion. The raion was abolished in July 2020 as part of the administrative reform of Ukraine, which reduced the number of raions of Chernivtsi Oblast to three. The area of Kitsman Raion was split between Chernivtsi Raion and Vyzhnytsia Raion, with Mamaivtsi being transferred to Chernivtsi Raion.

Notes 

Villages in Chernivtsi Raion
Populated places on the Prut